The 2017 Red Bull Air Race World Championship was the twelfth Red Bull Air Race World Championship series.

Aircraft and pilots

Master Class

Pilot changes
 Former champion Nigel Lamb retired from the sport following the final round of the 2016 season.
 2015 Challenger Class champion Mikaël Brageot made his debut in the Master Class.

Challenger Class
 All Challenger Cup Pilots used an Extra 330LX.

Race calendar and results 
On 16 December 2016, it was announced that the first round in the Arabian Gulf, Abu Dhabi will be held on 10-11 February. Other rounds were announced on 19 January 2017, with the final two European rounds announced on 8 March 2017. Due to organisational reasons, the Challenger round in Chiba was later rescheduled to Kazan, making it a double-header round for the class.

Championship standings

Master Class
Master Class scoring system

Challenger Class
Challenger Class scoring system

References

External links

 

 
Red Bull Air Race World Championship seasons
Red Bull Air Race
Red Bull Air Race